A New Beginning, originally titled The Royal Ranger, was the twelfth and final novel in the Ranger's Apprentice series, written by Australian author John Flanagan. It was released in Australia on 1 October 2013, in New Zealand on 4 October 2013, and in the United States and Canada on 5 November 2013. In 2018, it was renamed A New Beginning and it became the first book in the Ranger's Apprentice sequel series, The Royal Ranger.

Plot
Will Treaty tries to cope with the death of Alyss, who died in a fire set in an inn by a gang leader (Jory Ruhl) when she went back inside the burning building to save a young child. Will's friends begin to notice that his once cheerful personality has grown grim and uninviting. After numerous attempts to "snap him out of it", Gilan, the new Ranger Commandant calls on Halt, Pauline, Cassandra, and Horace to discuss how to deal with Will. Halt suggests that Will take on an apprentice to take his mind off his quest for revenge.

Meanwhile, Princess Madelyn, the daughter of Horace and Cassandra, is upset with her restrained royal life. Against the will of her parents, Maddie sneaks out at night to use her sling to hunt small animals. One night, Cassandra and Horace confront Maddie and ground her to her room for a period of two weeks. Halt suggests that Maddie be the one taken on by Will, which would make Maddie the first female Ranger's apprentice in Ranger history. At the beginning of her apprenticeship, Will gives Maddie a letter from her parents, in which says she has been disinherited as a princess of Araluen. This is a desperate last resort by her parents to get her under control. Will proceeds to train Maddie, and as he focuses on her, his quest for revenge is slowly forgotten. When Gilan suggests Will take Maddie on a mission, Will accepts without reluctance.

Gilan assigns Will and Maddie to investigate the death of Liam, a Ranger in Trelleth Fief, a northwestern fief. Will and Maddie soon discover a plot by an illicit slave ring who kidnap children. The criminals first send a storyteller to villages which frightens the children with a story about the "Stealer in the Night".  The storyteller seeks out a child who is likely being abused at home and also takes children who aren't quiet about speaking about the Stealer. Will learns that the Stealer in the Night — the leader of the slave ring — is actually Jory Ruhl, but he manages to set aside his revenge to save the children Ruhl has kidnapped. Will and Maddie go to the slavers' camp, where Will distracts the criminals, while Maddie frees the slaves. Unfortunately, while Maddie is successful in freeing the children, Will is captured by the gang and tied to a stake to be burned. Maddie then goes to save Will, ending in, Ruhl's death.

Six months later, Maddie is awarded her Bronze Oakleaf, and Cassandra offers her reinstatement as a princess. However, Maddie declines, saying she wishes to complete her apprenticeship instead. Cassandra is stunned, and the book concludes as Horace explains to her that Rangers have always been different. When Cassandra asks what she should do, Horace tells her they just have to live with it.

Reception
Kirkus Reviews remarked positively on the novel, calling it "An excellent addition to a favorite series; the short breather did Flanagan good."

References

External links
 The Royal Ranger at the Random House Australia website
 The Royal Ranger at the Random House New Zealand website

 Ranger's Apprentice books
2013 Australian novels
Random House books